Servin Suleimanov (born 25 January 1980) is a Ukrainian boxer. He competed in the men's featherweight event at the 2000 Summer Olympics.

References

1980 births
Living people
Ukrainian male boxers
Olympic boxers of Ukraine
Boxers at the 2000 Summer Olympics
Ukrainian people of Tajikistani descent
People from Sughd Region
Featherweight boxers